Downtown Fall River Historic District is a historic district on North and South Main, Bedford, Granite, Bank, Franklin, and Elm Streets in Fall River, Massachusetts.

The district was added to the National Register of Historic Places in 1983.

History
The Downtown Fall River Historic District contains many historic banks and other commercial properties primarily along North Main Street. This area was greatly impacted by the Great Fire of 1928, which destroyed many buildings located in what is now the historic district. As a result, many of the buildings date from about 1928 or 1929, having been rebuilt shortly after the fire. The area was also greatly impacted in the 1960s with the construction of Interstate-195 through the center of downtown, which resulted in the demolition of the Old City Hall, the Second Granite Block and several other 19th century commercial blocks.

Contributing properties
(partial listing)
United States Post Office, Bedford Street
State Armory, Bank Street
Public Library, North Main Street
Bank Five (formerly Fall River Five Cents Savings Bank), North Main Street
Masonic Temple, North Main Street
Police Athletic League Hall, Franklin Street

See also
National Register of Historic Places listings in Fall River, Massachusetts

References

Fall River, Massachusetts
Historic districts in Bristol County, Massachusetts
National Register of Historic Places in Fall River, Massachusetts
Historic districts on the National Register of Historic Places in Massachusetts